Sue Mengers (September 2, 1932 – October 15, 2011) was a talent agent for many filmmakers and actors of the New Hollywood generation of the 1960s, 1970s and early 1980s.

Early life
Susi Mengers was born to a Jewish family in Hamburg, Germany, the daughter of George and Ruth Mengers (née Levy). Several years of birth have been published, and while she was living, reporters stated "she won't say just when" she was born. In 1938, she arrived at age five in New York with her parents on the ship S.S. Koenigstein from Antwerp. Neither of her parents spoke English at the time. Settling in Utica, New York, her father became a traveling salesman. After her father's suicide in a Times Square hotel, she relocated to the Bronx with her mother, who took a job as a bookkeeper.

Career
Mengers entered the talent agency business in 1955 as a receptionist at MCA. She also worked for a while as a secretary for freelance theatrical agency Baum & Newborn. Eventually, she was hired as a secretary at the William Morris Agency, a powerhouse in the emerging television industry, where she remained until 1963, when a former Baum & Newborn colleague, Tom Korman, formed his own agency and hired her as a talent agent.

Her first big addition to her books was actress Julie Harris, who was primarily a stage performer. To Mengers' surprise, Harris wanted to appear on an episode of Bonanza. Mengers contacted the producer, who commissioned a specially written episode for Harris. Mengers represented Anthony Perkins, who had not worked in the United States since Psycho (1960). She contacted producer Ray Stark and obtained for Perkins a role in director René Clément's film Is Paris Burning? (1966).

In the late 1960s, she was hired by Creative Management Associates (CMA), a boutique agency owned by Freddie Fields. CMA's clients included Paul Newman, Steve McQueen and Robert Redford. On December 30, 1974, Fields sold the agency to Marvin Josephson's International Famous Agency (IFA); the two companies merged to become International Creative Management (ICM). Mengers represented Candice Bergen, Peter Bogdanovich, Michael Caine, Dyan Cannon, Cher, Joan Collins, Brian De Palma, Faye Dunaway, Bob Fosse, Gene Hackman, Sidney Lumet, Ali MacGraw, Steve McQueen, Mike Nichols, Nick Nolte, Tatum O'Neal, Ryan O'Neal, Burt Reynolds, Cybill Shepherd, Barbra Streisand, Gore Vidal, and Tuesday Weld, among others. Mengers ceased to be Streisand's agent, she told the Los Angeles Times, after a disagreement over Yentl (1983), which gained Oscar nominations but was not a big box-office hit. She retired from ICM in 1986 and returned to the William Morris Agency for a brief period from 1988-90.

Shortly after the Tate–LaBianca murders, Mengers reportedly reassured Streisand: "Don't worry, honey, stars aren't being murdered. Only featured players."

Personal life
On May 5, 1973, she married Belgian writer-director Jean-Claude Tramont (May 5, 1930 – December 27, 1996). Barbra Streisand was her maid of honor. Tramont died on December 27, 1996, aged 66, from cancer.

Death
Mengers died on Saturday, October 15, 2011, from pneumonia at her home in Beverly Hills, California, at age 79. Vanity Fair editor Graydon Carter posted a written tribute the following morning.

Legacy
 In the film The Last of Sheila (1973), the character played by actress Dyan Cannon was reportedly based on Mengers.
 Mengers expressed disapproval when she thought the character Shelley Winters portrayed in the Blake Edwards' film S.O.B. (1981), was based on her. She publicly stated that "An Alp should fall on their house."
 Elizabeth Taylor reportedly based her own character in the television movie These Old Broads (2001) on Mengers.
 In Barbara Walters' autobiography, Audition: A Memoir (2008), she describes Mengers as "a legend in the business. Smart, tough, and funny, she is also brutally honest."
 On April 24, 2013, Bette Midler opened at the Booth Theatre on Broadway in a one-woman play about Mengers, I'll Eat You Last: A Chat with Sue Mengers, written by John Logan.
 The character of Susie Myerson in the Amazon original series The Marvelous Mrs. Maisel (2017) was inspired by Mengers.
Mengers was portrayed in The Offer, a series about the making of The Godfather.

References

External links
 
 "Everybody Came to Sue's" article by Graydon Carter
 "Caftan Confidential" interview with Sue Mengers
 Sue Mengers' "Sabbatical from the Stars" L.A. Times article

1932 births
2011 deaths
American talent agents
American women in film
Hollywood talent agents
American people of German-Jewish descent
Deaths from pneumonia in California
People from the Bronx
Businesspeople from Utica, New York
20th-century American businesspeople
20th-century American women
21st-century American women